Peter Casey (born 1950) is an American television producer and screenwriter. Alongside his working partner David Lee, he wrote episodes of The Jeffersons. Besides writing, he and Lee wrote and produced Cheers, and co-created, wrote, and produced Wings and Frasier alongside the late David Angell under Grub Street Productions. He has won seven Emmys.

References

External links

Primetime Emmy Award winners
Living people
1950 births
American television producers
American television writers
American male television writers
Showrunners
San Francisco State University alumni